Recollects may refer to:

Catholic organisations

Recollects, a Franciscan Recollection group established in France as a result of the reforms that were implemented in various mendicant orders during the 16th and 17th centuries, as part of the Roman Catholic Counter-Reformation.
Order of Augustinian Recollects, the first Augustinian Recollection that originated in Spain as a result of the Chapter of Toledo in 1589.
Discalced Augustinians, another Augustinian Recollection that originated in Italy in 1610.

Geography

Paseo de Recoletos, Spain
Rue des Récollets, Quebec City
 Parroquia La Recoleta, Cochabamba, Bolivia 
 Convento La Recoleta, Sucre, Bolivia 
La Recoleta Cemetery, Buenos Aires, Argentina 
Recoleta, Buenos Aires, Argentina 
Colegio Sagrados Corazones Recoleta, Lima, Peru